Chronoxenus walshi is a species of ant of the genus Chronoxenus. It was described by Forel in 1895, and was formerly a part of the genus Iridomyrmex. They are endemic to Bangladesh, India and China.

References

Dolichoderinae
Insects of Bangladesh
Insects of India
Insects of China
Insects described in 1895